Ferdinand Marie Léon Delagrange (13 March 1872 – 4 January 1910) was a sculptor and pioneering French aviator, ranked as one of the top aviators in the world.

Early years

Léon Delagrange was born on 13 March 1872 in Orléans, France, the son of a textile factory owner. As a teenager he studied sculpture at the École des Beaux-Arts under Louis Barrias and Charles Vital-Cornu and was represented at several exhibitions in Paris. He was a member of the "Society of French Artists" and received a commendation in 1901. Delagrange became a well-known automobilist.

Early aviation

Delagrange was one of the first men in Europe to take up aviation. In 1907, he became interested in flying and became a pioneer of powered flight. That same year he was one of the first people to order an aircraft from Gabriel Voisin of the Voisin brothers, enabling them to get established as manufacturers of airplanes. The aircraft was the first example of what was to become one of the most successful early French aircraft, the Voisin 1907 biplane. His first public flight was made on 16 March 1907 at Bagatelle (France) where he flew a biplane. His feats soon attracted worldwide attention and he is said to have refused a guarantee of $10,000 if he would visit the United States to perform demonstrations. In 1907, Delagrange was elected president of the Aviation Club of France.

During 1908, Delagrange toured Italy where he made flight demonstrations. It was during one of these demonstrations on 8 July 1908 that he made the world's first flight with a lady passenger, his partner and fellow sculptor Thérèse Peltier. In September 1908, Delagrange set distance and endurance records, establishing a record of 15.2 miles in 29 minutes, 53 seconds.

On 7 January 1909, he was awarded one of the first eight aviators certificates awarded by the Aéro-Club de France. In 1909, he also received the Lagatiner prize at Juvisy (3.6 miles in 10 minutes, 18 seconds).

He participated in the world's first air race at Port-Aviation on 23 May 1909, and a further couple of race meetings during that same year. In addition to his original Voisins airplane, he also bought three Blériot XIs, and formed a team by recruiting Hubert Le Blon, Léon Molon and Georges Prévoteau. He also flew in several non-competitive meetings. He was the first to equip a Blériot XI with a 50 hp Gnôme engine in place of the 25 hp Anzani, thereby doubling its power.

During 1909, Léon Delagrange participated in the following air race meetings:
 Port-Aviation 23 May 1909
 Port-Aviation 30 May - 3 June 1909
 Reims 1909
 Spa 1909
 Doncaster 1909

1909 Doncaster Aviation Meeting

Delagrange is known for his flight at the First Flying Meeting in England, the Doncaster Aviation Meeting (18 and 26 October 1909), where on the second and final day of the races (Tuesday, 26 October 1909), he flew his Gnome-engine Blériot XI monoplane on a one 6-mile lap in 7 minutes and 36 seconds (approximately 50–53 miles/hour), breaking the World record in spite of the infamously stormy weather Delagrange was 4th in the Doncater Aviation competition program, which also included pilots such as Samuel Cody, Roger Sommer, Hubert Le Blon, Leon Molon, Walter Windham (the Aeroplane Club's founder), and Edward Mines.

A cartoon sketch from Dudley Hardy of Delagrange during his stay in Doncaster was reproduced in the Doncaster Aviation Meeting Souvenir Programme (18–23 October 1909).

1909 Michelin Cup

On 30 December 1909 at Juvisy-sur-Orge (France), in an attempt to win the Michelin Cup, he established a new distance record for monoplanes and a new world speed record, having covered 124 miles in two hours and thirty-two minutes (averaging a speed of approximately 49 miles/hour); however, he did not succeed in beating Henry Farman's record for distance.

Death
On 4 January 1910, in front of a crowd of spectators, he was piloting his Blériot XI as part of the Croix d'Hins over Bordeaux (France) in stormy weather, in an area whose winds frequently blew at the rate of 20 miles/hour. This flight was a preliminary flight before Delagrange's planned attempt to break Henry Farman's distance record that afternoon. Delagrange had circled the aerodrome three times when suddenly as he was turning at high speed against the wind, the left wing of the monoplane broke resulting in the other wing immediately collapsing. The plane fell from a height of approximately 65 feet, turning half over as it fell. Delagrange did not have time to disengage himself from his seat and was killed when the wreckage of his plane crashed to the ground, with his skull being crushed under the weight of the motor. The monoplane had been doubly-braced at the essential points and had been given a careful examination before ascending, with the accident attributed to the plane "maneuvering too quickly into the puffy wind".

Delagrange was the world's fourth pilot to die in an airplane crash, all of whom died within a fifteen-month period. A number of the other Doncaster competitors were similarly killed flying in subsequent years, including Le Blon (1910), Cody (1913).

Awards and commemorations
Delagrange was made president of the Aéro-Club de France in 1908. On 21 July 1909, he was decorated as a Knight of the Legion of Honor. In December 1909, he received an enamel medal from the French Academy of Sciences for aeronautic achievements.

When the first French "Brevets de Pilote" were granted in 1910, Delagrange received No. 3, based on the alphabetical order between the first fourteen holders.

Doncaster Brewery produced a special brew to commemorate Ferdinand Léon Delagrange's achievements during the Doncaster Aviation Flight Meeting held in 1909.

References

External links
Leon Delagrange Champagne|Berceau de l'aviation du Monde website
First Air Races A list of airplanes flown by Léon Delagrange

1872 births
1910 deaths
Aviators killed in aviation accidents or incidents in France
Aviation pioneers
Chevaliers of the Légion d'honneur
Artists from Orléans
École des Beaux-Arts alumni
20th-century French sculptors
French male sculptors
Flight distance record holders
Flight endurance record holders
French aviation record holders
Victims of aviation accidents or incidents in 1910